The Abbeville Subdivision is a railroad line owned by CSX Transportation in the U.S. states of South Carolina and Georgia. At its north end it continues south from the Monroe Subdivision and at its south end it continues south as the Atlanta Terminal Subdivision.

See also
 List of CSX Transportation lines

References

CSX Transportation lines
Rail infrastructure in South Carolina
Rail infrastructure in Georgia (U.S. state)